Flashpoint or flash point may refer to:

Flash point, the lowest temperature at which a liquid forms a flammable vapor

Arts and media

Film 
 Flashpoint (1972 film), Australian film starring Serge Lazareff
 Flashpoint (1984 film), starring Kris Kristofferson
 Flashpoint (1998 film), adult film starring Jenna Jameson
 Flash Point (film), 2007 film starring Donnie Yen and Louis Koo
 Justice League: The Flashpoint Paradox, 2013 superhero film
 The Flash, a superhero film currently in production with The Flash, and taking influence from the Flashpoint comic book storyline.

Music 
 Flashpoint (album), 1991 album by the Rolling Stones
 Flashpoint (soundtrack), 1984 album by Tangerine Dream
 "Flashpoint", 1995 song by Fear Factory from Demanufacture
 Flashpoint Music, Australian music publisher
 Flashpoint (band), American jazz group

Print 
 Flashpoint (Unstoppable), the fourth and last book in the Unstoppable series
 Flashpoint (Elseworlds), a 1999 comic book series
 Flashpoint (comics), a 2011 comic book series
 Flashpoints (radio program) a 2001 news program from Berkeley, California

Television 
 "Flashpoint", sixth episode of the 1964 Doctor Who serial The Dalek Invasion of Earth
 Flashpoint (TV series), 2008-2012 Canadian crime series
 "Flashpoint" (The Flash episode), first episode of the third season of The Flash series
 Flashpoint, a television programme produced by Seven Network

Other media 
 Operation Flashpoint, series of military simulation computer games since 2001
 Flash Point: Fire Rescue, a 2011 Kevin Lanzing board game
 BlueMaxima's Flashpoint, an online preservation project primarily focused on Adobe Flash